is a 1995 action role-playing game developed by Quintet for the Super Nintendo Entertainment System (SNES), with manga artist Kamui Fujiwara acting as the character designer. The game tells the story of the Earth's resurrection by the hands of a boy named Ark, and its progress from the evolution of life to the present day. The game is considered the third and final entry in an unofficial trilogy of action RPGs created by Quintet, also including Soul Blazer (1992) and Illusion of Gaia (1993).

Terranigma was published in Japan by Enix on October 20, 1995, and in Europe and Australia by Nintendo starting in December 1996; the game was not released in North America due to Enix having already closed its U.S. branch by the time localization had finished, and has not been re-released due to complicated issues relating to its rights. The game has been met with critical acclaim for its presentation, gameplay, and story, although it has been criticized for its difficulty.

Gameplay

The game keeps a top-down perspective view of the world and utilizes an action-based real-time battle system that allows the player to perform different techniques depending on whether the protagonist is running, jumping, attacking, or using a combination of these three actions. Each attack is meant for dealing more damage to certain kinds of enemies, though in most cases there is little to no difference regardless of the technique used. Projectiles launched at Ark can be blocked by the guard technique, which is otherwise ineffective against melee attacks.

With each victory, experience points are gained, increasing the protagonist's level and his maximum hit points, strength, defense, and luck. Slain enemies sometimes leave behind gems which can be used to buy weapons, armors, healing items, and spells. There are no magic points in the game, all spells take the form of one-time use items instead. The player must collect Magirocks and take them to a magic shop to have them transformed into magic rings and summon medals. Those items are used up when casting the corresponding spell and then turn back to Magirocks which may be exchanged for new spells again. Upon defeating bosses and completing miscellaneous tasks, new types of magic become available.

Synopsis

Setting and characters 

In Terranigma, the planet is portrayed as a hollow sphere (though the map in the game is mathematically a torus) that has both an external and internal face. Since the beginning of the Earth, the external Lightside, the surface world, stood for growth whereas the internal Darkside, the underworld, represented decline. Over the course of billions of years, these two forces came to be called God and Devil. Regardless of this inner antagonism, rapid progress took root and primitive life forms evolved to plants, animals, and humans. Technology and industry further expanded civilization, but the fight between God and the Devil was still taking place, more fiercely than ever. The conflict culminated in a final battle in Antarctica, on the surface world. However, neither of the two forces was victorious. The continents of the surface world submerged into the sea and the underworld was sealed away.

Plot 

The first chapter of the game, "The Outset", introduces Ark, a mischievous boy who lives in Crysta, the only village in the underworld. After opening a forbidden door and touching a mysterious box containing a friendly demon named Yomi, every citizen in the village is frozen. The only person not affected by the curse, the Elder, guides him to resurrect the continents of the surface world in order to unfreeze the people. A way out of his hometown appears, and for the first time ever, a human being leaves Crysta to explore the underworld, which is portrayed as a frozen wasteland of imposing crystal mountains, crossed by rivers of magma. He conquers the trials of the five towers, each representing one continent, and revives the mainland of the Earth. Upon returning to his hometown, the Elder instructs him to travel to the surface world and to resurrect all living beings. With a heavy heart, Ark says goodbye to his lifelong devoted friend Elle and sets out to the Lightside. In the second chapter, "Resurrection of the World", after having crossed a dimensional crevasse, Ark is confronted with the barren land that was once the Earth's surface. His first task is to free the giant tree Ra from a parasite that is afflicting him. This causes the resurrection of all plants in the world, helping Ark to cross the mountains of Guiana. He travels further into the world, reviving birds, the wind, animals, and eventually mankind.

In the third chapter, "Resurrection of the Genius", the Elder appears to Ark in a dream and tells him to keep helping humanity grow, as the world is still in the fledgling stages. He continues his journey, traveling and expanding cities, assisting with the invention of groundbreaking technologies, and also—much to his surprise—encountering a Lightside twin of Elle, who lives as the adopted daughter of a French king but was rendered mute by a traumatic event in her childhood. Ark manages to break this condition, and although Princess Elle at first stays away from Ark, she begins to grow close to him. In continuing to follow the Elder's commands, Ark ultimately awakes the ingenious Beruga, a scientist who survived the destruction of the previous world by hiding himself in cryogenic sleep. Beruga provides Ark with an insight into his personal image of paradise: a perfect world where all insignificant life is killed with a virus named Asmodeus and everyone else is made immortal by turning them into zombies. Ark tries to attack Beruga after this revealing twist but is stopped by robots, injuring him severely in the process.

The Elder once again appears to him, saying that his mission is fulfilled and he may now pass away. Ark realizes that he has been used by Dark Gaia (the "Devil"), whose plans of world domination required Ark to resurrect the planet. Just as he is about to die, Kumari, a wise human who watched the world's growth through reincarnation, teleports Ark out of Beruga's laboratory. He then instructs him to go search the five Starstones and to lay them at the grave at Time's End in order to call the Golden Child. Ark obtains the stones one after another and sets them into skull statues at Dryvale, the location at the South Pole where the final confrontation between God and the Devil once took place. This leads to the appearance of Ark's Lightside self; the person Dark Gaia used to create Ark himself. His Lightside self reveals to him that he, the underworld Ark, is the legendary hero and then kills him. However, in the fourth and final chapter, "Resurrection of the Hero", Ark is reborn as a baby through the soul of the surface world, Light Gaia. He is kidnapped by Darkside Elle, who was led there by Yomi to eliminate a threat to Crysta. When she realizes this threat is actually Ark, she allows him to awaken as the legendary hero and grow back into an adult in the process. Yomi then decides to kill Ark by himself and reveals he has been working for Dark Gaia all along. He fails, as Darkside Elle sacrifices herself to kill Yomi and save Ark's life. Yomi is conveniently replaced by a "Light Version".

Afterward, Ark departs to defeat Beruga. After he conquers the professor, he returns to the underworld to defeat Dark Gaia. The victory over that entity brings forth the destruction of the Darkside. In the end, Ark realizes that as a creation of Dark Gaia, he, along with the village of Crysta and the underworld, shall now vanish with the Devil's demise, though it is implied he and his loved ones in Crysta will be reincarnated. He goes to sleep, after being told by Light Gaia that he, as creator and defender, is what the humans would call a god. Ark's last dream pictures him as a bird flying above the world that he helped to exist, watching it grow older. An epilogue plays which shows Lightside Elle at her original home. There is a knock at the door, and she answers it. The game then ends.

Development
Terranigma was developed by the Japanese company Quintet, which had previously designed creation-themed Super NES games such as ActRaiser and Soul Blazer. It is considered to be part of an unofficial trilogy with the games Illusion of Gaia and Soul Blazer. Publisher Enix commissioned the developers as a subcontractor and decided for the title to be an action role-playing game for strategic reasons, based on Quintet's experience in that particular genre and the good reception of their earlier games by Japanese players.

The theme of creation prevalent in Terranigma was introduced as a contrast to the destruction of enemies in other action titles, and to inspire the player's imagination concerning the effects their actions might have. The script was written by director and designer Tomoyoshi Miyazaki, the founder of Quintet, with the scenario provided by Reiko Takebayashi. Tatsuo Hashimoto created the computer graphics cover art and also rendered the background images for the resurrection scenes.

The music of Terranigma was composed by Miyoko Takaoka and Masanori Hikichi, the latter of whom was responsible for the design of the sounds as well. The English scripts of the game used in the European and Australian releases by Nintendo were translated by Colin Palmer, Dan Owsen, Hiro Nakamura and Nob Ogasawara.

Release 
Terranigma was first previewed in mid-1995 and slated for an October launch window. Early previews prior to release showcased several differences compared to the final version such as the ability to climb the five towers outside using claws, different room layouts and plant decorations around the HUD. It was first released in Japan on October 20, 1995, by Enix for the Super Famicom under the name Tenchi Sōzō. The title was then released in Europe on December 19, 1996, by Nintendo. It was also released in Spain in April 1997 and in France on the summer of 1997. The game wound up never being published in North America because Enix had already closed its US subsidiary by the time the localization was finished.

Terranigma was released alongside several pieces of merchandise in Japan, including an official guide book, a world atlas, a novel by Saori Kumi, a novelization by Norio Nakai titled Logout Bunko Tenchi Sōzō, a gamebook featuring artwork by character designer Kamui Fujiwara, and the two-volume manga Gangan Fantasy Comics: Tenchi Sōzō by Mamiko Yasaka. Except for the guide book, none of these materials have been released outside Japan, though Club Nintendo published a 32-page comic illustrating scenes from the game up to the events of the third chapter in Germany. A Japanese soundtrack album titled Tenchi Sōzō Creative Soundtracks, with 33 compositions and six arranged tracks of the game's music, was released by Kitty Enterprises on October 25, 1995.

A petition by the game's Japanese fanbase, backed by artist Kamui Fujiwara and co-composer Miyoko Takaoka, began in July 2021 to either re-release or remaster Terranigma. This fan-led effort renewed speculation on the status of the rights to Quintet's games. According to Fujiwara, Quintet president Tomoyoshi Miyazaki had "disappeared" to his knowledge; he speculated this was why the rights to republish the game were complicated, that Miyazaki was not available for contact.

Reception 

Terranigma garnered acclaim from critics. GameFans Kei Kuboki described it as Quintet's "best (...) effort" and being "among the [Super NES's] most memorable titles". The game holds a 74.14% rating based on seven reviews at review aggregator GameRankings, and was given the "Silver Hall of Fame" award from Famitsu. It received a 23.3 out of 30 score in a public poll taken by Family Computer Magazine. Quintet reported that 200,000 copies were sold in Japan.

Famitsus four reviewers gave Terranigma a score of 30 out of 40. Likewise, The Super Famicoms three reviewers gave it a 78 out of 100 scores. MAN!ACs Robert Bannert praised its atmospheric world, characters, stereo soundtrack, map design and sophisticated controls, regarding it as a good game in the Japanese action-adventure tradition. Total!s Michael Anton commended its varied locations, soundtrack, ease of play, and plot but several aspects such as the difficulty level were criticized. Nevertheless, Anton recommended the title for fans of the action-adventure genre, stating that it would tide over fans until the release of Lufia II. Computer and Video Gamess Paul Davies gave high remarks to its controls, artwork, music, presentation, and storytelling, regarding it as an outstanding addition to the SNES' action-adventure role-playing game library "with a powerful message". Mega Funs Rene Schneider gave positive comments to the graphics, music, controls and technical performance but criticized the game's strategy guide for revealing many of the puzzles, lowering its fun factor.

Video Games Jan Schweinitz regarded it as a "worthy successor" to Zelda III. Superjuegoss Marcos García also regarded Terranigma as one of the best and most ambitious action role-playing games for SNES, stating that it surpasses Illusion of Time and Secret of Evermore. García commended the Spanish translation, visual quality, graphical effects and epic soundtrack. Hobby Consolass Roberto Lorente praised its mix of action and role-playing elements, stating that it surpasses Zelda while capturing its spirit. Lorente also gave high remarks to the Mode 7 maps, audio, controls and absorbing plot. Nintendo Accións Javier Abad gave very positive comments to the varied scenery, carefully crafted plot involving secondary storylines and freedom of movement but criticized its dungeon maps. Joypads Grégoire Hellot regarded the game to be interesting and entertaining, stating that "Zelda fans will be in for a treat". Player Ones Christophe Pottier also stated that the game was excellent and "technically perfect" presentation-wise. Both Hellot and Pottier recognized the game's quality but panned its late French release date, stating that it should have been published before Final Fantasy VII.

Retrospective coverage 
Terranigma continues to be regarded as one of the best action role-playing games of its era. RPGFans Jeremy Tan considered it as "one of Enix's greatest Action RPG games ever", praising the fast-paced combat system, visual presentation, varied soundtrack and simple controls but lamented the lack of a North American release. 1Up.coms Jeremy Parish described it as Quintet's best-known Super Nintendo action-RPG, noting the quality of the gameplay, music and deep story themes. Nintendo Lifes Corbie Dillard highly commended its easy-to-pick-up controls, graphics, emotional music score, sense of scale and evolving plot. Jeuxvideo.coms Zashy regarded its graphical effects as among the most beautiful on SNES while giving positive remarks to the playability, longevity, soundtrack and storyline. Zashy noted that its difficulty can put some players off but nevertheless claimed that "Terranigma will undoubtedly remain the title that marked the end of the reign of SNES in the most poetic way possible".

RPGamers Mike Moehnke noted its narrative to be interesting on a consistent basis and praised the varied locations, fast combat system and audiovisual presentation but criticized the low difficulty level and unnecessary magic system. Moehnke also questioned the lack of a North American release but regarded Terranigma as "Quintet's final hurrah on the SNES" nevertheless. USgamers Nadia Oxford concurred and expressed disappointment with the lack of an official North American release due to the closure of Enix's branch in the region and lack of a Virtual Console re-release but described its music as one of the best soundtracks on the SNES. Hardcore Gaming 101s David DiRienzo also agreed with the lack of a North American localization but regarded Terranigma as "the best of" both Soul Blazer and Illusion of Gaia, commending its less restrictive design, Zelda-style dungeon maps, refined gameplay mechanics and music score but criticized the inconsistent visual presentation, cumbersome magic system and certain aspects of its plot. Regardless, DiRienzo stated that the title was one of the better action RPGs on SNES.

Notes

References

External links 

  via Internet Archive 
  at Square Enix 
  of Kamui Fujiwara 

1995 video games
Action role-playing video games
Enix games
Existentialist video games
Fiction about Earth
Hollow Earth in fiction
Nintendo games
Post-apocalyptic video games
Quintet (company) games
Science fiction video games
Single-player video games
Super Nintendo Entertainment System games
Super Nintendo Entertainment System-only games
Video games about evolution
Video games developed in Japan
Video games scored by Miyoko Takaoka